Zadadra distorta is a moth of the subfamily Arctiinae. It is found in Nepal, India (Sikkim, Assam) and Pulau Laut.

References

Moths described in 1872
Lithosiina